The 3 μm process is the level of MOSFET semiconductor process technology that was reached around 1977, by leading semiconductor companies such as Intel.

Products featuring 3 μm manufacturing process
 Intel's 8085, 8086, 8088 CPU's launched in 1976, 1978, 1979, respectively, were manufactured using its 3.2 μm NMOS (HMOS) process. .
 Hitachi's 4kbit HM6147 SRAM memory chip, launched in 1978, introduced the twin-well CMOS process, at 3 μm.
 Motorola 68000 (MC68000) CPU, launched in 1979, was originally fabricated using an HMOS process with a 3.5 μm feature size.
 The ARM1 was launched in 1985 and manufactured on a 3μm process.

References

03000
Computer-related introductions in 1975